John Hastie may refer to:

 John Hastie (rugby union) (1908–1965), Scottish rugby union player
 John Hastie (sport shooter) (1938–2021), New Zealand sport shooter and gunsmith
 John Hastie (umpire) (born 1932), New Zealand cricket umpire